is a Japanese voice actress from Sapporo, Hokkaido. She is affiliated with Mausu Promotion. Her major roles are Anzu Futaba in the Japanese idol franchise The Idolmaster Cinderella Girls; Hina Takanashi, the youngest daughter in Listen to Me, Girls. I Am Your Father!; and Wilhelmina in High School Fleet.

Filmography

Anime
{| class="wikitable sortable plainrowheaders"
|+ List of voice performances in anime
! Year
! Title
! Role
! class="unsortable"| Notes
! class="unsortable"| Source
|-
|  || You're Under Arrest: Full Throttle || Girl || Ep. 16 || 
|-
|  || Ayakashi || Child || Ep. 9 ||  
|-
|  || Yu-Gi-Oh 5D's || West || || 
|-
|  || Nijū Mensō no Musume || Audience ||  || 
|-
|  || Kyōran Kazoku Nikki || Shinobu Shinki || || 
|-
|  || Kupū~!! Mamegoma! || Taunton || || 
|-
|  || The Beast Player Erin || Saju || || 
|-
|  || Kanamemo || Girl, Classmate ||  ||  
|-
|  || Modern Magic Made Simple || Boy ||   || 
|-
|  || Nogizaka Haruka no Himitsu: Purezza || Koayu Nagikawa || Also OVA in 2012 || 
|-
|  || Hellsing Ultimate || Pip Bernadotte (boy) || Hellsing Ultimate VII || 
|-
|  || Ladies versus Butlers! || Schoolgirl || || 
|-
|  || Baka and Test series || Yūka Koyama || 2 seasons || 
|-
|  || The Qwaser of Stigmata || Eva S.  || || 
|-
|  || Hanamaru Kindergarten || Yū Kobayakawa || || 
|-
|  || HeartCatch PreCure! || Boy || || 
|-
|  || Maid Sama! || Aoi Hyoudou  || || 
|-
| –11 || Mitsudomoe  series  || Kamo, Kurano, Ueno || 2 seasons || 
|-
|  || Oreimo || Rinko ||  || 
|-
|  || Fortune Arterial || Schoolgirl, Committee member || || 
|-
|  || Princess Jellyfish || Child ||  || 
|-
|  || Dream Eater Merry || Masaru ||  || 
|-
|  || I Don't Like You at All, Big Brother!! || Shūsuke Takanashi (child) || || 
|-
|  || Bakugan Battle Brawlers: Gundalian Invaders || Lewin || || 
|-
|  || Tono to Issho: Gantai no Yabō || Shimadzu Kagak || || 
|-
|  || Jewelpet Sunshine || Alex || || 
|-
|  || Blade || Alice || || 
|-
|  || Battle Spirits: Heroes  || Boy || || 
|-
|  || Fate/Zero || Boy ||  || 
|-
|  || Chihayafuru || Tomihara Nishi High School Karuta Department members || || 
|-
|  || The Knight in the Area || Chika Takase || || 
|-
| –13 || Listen to Me, Girls. I Am Your Father! series || Hina Takanashi || || 
|-
|  || Black Rock Shooter || Various characters || || 
|-
|  || Zoobles || Blackie, Rou, Peel, Randy, Mei, Lily || || 
|-
|  || Gon || Fu || || 
|-
|  || Kuromajo-san ga Toru!! || Sayaka Suzukaze || || 
|-
|  || Natsuiro Kiseki || Various characters || || 
|-
|  || Sengoku Collection || Boy || || 
|-
|  || Shirokuma Cafe || Customer, child, clerk || || 
|-
|  || Jewelpet KiraDeco—! || Alex || || 
|-
|  || Another: The Other -Inga || Misaki Fujioka || OVA || 
|-
|  || Tanken Driland || Leo (young) || || 
|-
|  || Haitai Nanafa || Iina || || 
|-
|  || Amnesia || Orion || || 
|-
|  || Tamako Market || Tatsuya ||  || 
|-
|  || Problem Children Are Coming from Another World, Aren't They? || Jin Rassel  || || 
|-
|  || Karneval || Hitsuji, Usagi || || 
|-
|  || Angel's Drop || Un  || || 
|-
|  || Dog & Scissors || Yayoi Honda || || 
|-
|  || Noucome || Seira Kokubyakuin || || 
|-
|  || Sakura Trick || Shizuku Minami  || || 
|-
|  || No-Rin || Akina Nakazawa || || 
|-
|  || Kamigami no Asobi || Keiko || || 
|-
|  || Haikyu!! || Tennis Club Girl ||  || 
|-
|  || Knights of Sidonia || Hinata Momose || || 
|-
|  || Rail Wars! || Mari Sasshō || || 
|-
|  || Fūsen inu tinī:ja:ティニー ふうせんいぬのものがたり   || Zevi || || 
|-
|  || Aikatsu! || Asahi Higashi || season 3 || 
|-
|  || Log Horizon || Coppelia || season 2 || 
|-
|  || Amagi Brilliant Park || Eiko Adachi || || 
|-
|  || Gonna be the Twin-Tail!! || Miharu Mitsuka  || || 
|-
|  || Girl Friend Beta || Sumire Yomogida || || 
|-
|  || The Idolmaster Cinderella Girls || Anzu Futaba || 2 seasons || 
|-
|  || The Rolling Girls || Himeko Uotora || || 
|-
|  || Jewelpet: Magical Change|| Alex || || 
|-
| –21 || Show By Rock series || Holmy || || 
|-
|  || Senran Kagura: Estival Versus – Festival Eve Full of Swimsuits || Minori || OVA || 
|-
| –16 || Durarara!!x2 series || Mikage Sharaku  || || 
|-
|  || Overlord || Yuri Alpha || || 
|-
|  || The Kindaichi Case Files R || Nazuki Unza || series 2 || 
|-
|  || Concrete Revolutio || Morino Wakaba || || 
|-
|  || Dōshitemo Eto ni Hairitai''':ja:どうしても干支にはいりたい || Usagi || || 
|-
|  || Haruchika || Misato Aso || || 
|-
|  || The Lost Village || Lion || || 
|-
|  || Joker Game || Boy (cousin) || || 
|-
|  || High School Fleet || Wilhelmina Braunschweig Ingenohl Friedeburg || || 
|-
|  || Tales of Zestiria the X || Symonne || || 
|-
|  || Tsukita the Animation:ja:ツキウタ。 THE ANIMATION || Girls spirit || || 
|-
|  || Kaiju Girls || Red King || || 
|-
|  || Odddy Taro Boys' Youkai Picture Diary:ja:奇異太郎少年の妖怪絵日記 || Taro Oda || || 
|-
|  || Brave Witches || Edytha Rossmann  || || 
|-
|  || Long Riders! || Aoi Niigaki || ||  
|-
|  || Piacevole! || Sara Teiri || || 
|-
| –20 || Tsugumomo series || Suzuri Sumeragi || || 
|-
| –19 || The Idolmaster Cinderella Girls Theater series || Anzu Futaba || 4 seasons || 
|-
|  || Battle Girl High School || Hinata Minami  || || 
|-
|  || NTR: Netsuzou Trap || Hotaru Mizushina ||  || 
|-
|  || Juni Taisen: Zodiac War || Kanae Aira  || || 
|-
|  || Crayon Shin-chan || Female Staff, Weathergirl B   || || 
|-
|  || Beatless || Snowdrop || || 
|-
|  || Mini Toji || Kofuki Shichinosato || || 
|-
|  || Maesetsu! || Rin Shinya || || 
|-
|  || Ancient Girl's Frame || Akhena Hakim || || 
|-
|  || Flaglia || Iko || || 
|-
|  || The Demon Sword Master of Excalibur Academy || Elfiné || || 
|-
|}

Films

Video games

Drama CD

DubbingThe Diary of a Teenage Girl'' as Minnie Goetze (Bel Powley)

References

External links 
  
 

1986 births
Living people
Japanese video game actresses
Japanese voice actresses
Mausu Promotion voice actors
Voice actresses from Sapporo
21st-century Japanese actresses
21st-century Japanese women singers
21st-century Japanese singers
Japanese people of Taiwanese descent